David Charles Nye (born October 10, 1958) is an American lawyer and jurist who is the Chief United States district judge of the U.S. District Court for the District of Idaho. He was a state court judge for Idaho's Sixth District Court from 2007 to 2017, and before that spent twenty years in private practice in Idaho.

Early life and education 

Nye was born in 1958 in Lynwood, California. He graduated from Brigham Young University (BYU) in 1982 with a Bachelor of Arts in English literature. He worked for Swire's Coca-Cola bottling plant in Salt Lake City, then attended BYU's J. Reuben Clark Law School, graduating in 1986 with a Juris Doctor degree.

Career 

Nye began his legal career in 1986 in Idaho at Burley, as a law clerk to Judge George G. Granata of the state's Fifth District Court. The following year, he joined the law firm of Merrill & Merrill in Pocatello as an associate. He became a partner in 1989, specialized in medical malpractice and insurance law, and stayed with the firm until 2007.

In 2007, Nye became a judge in the Sixth Judicial District and presided over civil and criminal matters for ten years.

Federal judicial service

Expired nomination under Obama 
On the recommendation of U.S. Senators Mike Crapo and Jim Risch, President Barack Obama nominated Nye on April 5, 2016, to serve as a judge of the U.S. District Court for the District of Idaho. Nye was nominated to the seat vacated by Judge Edward Lodge, who assumed senior status on July 3, 2015.

The Senate Judiciary Committee held a hearing on his nomination on June 21, 2016, and his nomination was reported out of committee by voice vote on July 14. The nomination expired on January 3, 2017, with the end of the 114th Congress.

Shortly after the 2016 election, Senators Crapo and Risch indicated that if Nye was not confirmed by year's end, they would recommend him to incoming President Donald Trump for renomination in the 115th Congress.

Renomination under Trump 
On Thursday, April 27, 2017, Senators Crapo and Risch indicated that President Trump had signed off on renominating Nye for the same post, and his renomination was announced on May 8. Nye was unanimously rated as "well qualified" by the American Bar Association, as he had been during his prior nomination in 2016. On June 15, his nomination was reported out of committee by a voice vote. On July 10, 2017, the Senate invoked cloture on his nomination by a 97–0 vote. On July 12, 2017, his nomination was confirmed by a 100–0 vote. Nye was commissioned the same day. He was sworn in on August 1, 2017 in a private ceremony. He became Chief Judge on January 2, 2019, succeeding B. Lynn Winmill.

See also 
 Barack Obama judicial appointment controversies

References

External links 
 
 Biography at District of Idaho
 

|-

|-

1958 births
Living people
20th-century American lawyers
21st-century American lawyers
21st-century American judges
Idaho lawyers
Idaho state court judges
J. Reuben Clark Law School alumni
Judges of the United States District Court for the District of Idaho
Latter Day Saints from Idaho
People from Lynwood, California
United States district court judges appointed by Donald Trump